Knecht's Covered Bridge is a historic covered bridge in Springfield Township, Bucks County, Pennsylvania. It crosses Cooks Creek on Knecht Bridge Road south of Springtown. Built in 1873 in the town truss style, the bridge is 110 feet long and 15 feet wide.

It was added to the National Register of Historic Places on December 1, 1980.

See also
National Register of Historic Places listings in Bucks County, Pennsylvania
List of bridges on the National Register of Historic Places in Pennsylvania

References

Covered bridges in Bucks County, Pennsylvania
Covered bridges on the National Register of Historic Places in Pennsylvania
Bridges in Bucks County, Pennsylvania
Bridges completed in 1873
Tourist attractions in Bucks County, Pennsylvania
National Register of Historic Places in Bucks County, Pennsylvania
Road bridges on the National Register of Historic Places in Pennsylvania
Wooden bridges in Pennsylvania
Lattice truss bridges in the United States